The 1910 Inter-State Series Final was the second Inter-State Series ice hockey championship in Australia and for the first time was held in the Sydney Glaciarium.

The series

The inter-state ice hockey championship was held between a state representative team from Victoria and from New South Wales. This tournament was a best-of-3 format and saw Victoria win the series 3 games to 0. The first winner of 2 games in the series was often quoted in newspapers as "securing / winning the 'rubber ", which is terminology used in the game of Rubber Bridge where in a best of 3 competition a rubber is awarded to the team that first wins 2 games of the 3. The game itself was played in two halves of 10min each with a break in between.

Game one
23 July 1910 was the first game of the series and was held at the Sydney Glaciarium in front of an enthusiastic crowd of 2000 people. Victora defeated the New South Wales team by a score of 4-2 with goals being scored by Victorians Andrew Reid (who had 2 goals), Robert Jackson and Dudley Woods. Scoring for New South Wales was done by Jack Pike and Les Turnbull.

Game two
Wednesday 27 July 1910 proved to be a difficult day for New South Wales as Victoria overwhelmed them by a score of 12-0.

Game three

The evening of Friday 29 July 1910 marked the third straight win for Victoria with a convincing 8-0 victory over New South Wales. The goals were scored by Henry "Hal" Newman Reid Jr., who had five goals and his brother Andrew Reid with three goals.

Teams

Victoria
The Victoria team was made from the following players

 E. C. Walker (Captain)
 Andrew Reid (Vice Captain)
 J. Blair
 Robert Jackson
 Dudley Woods
 Cyril Macgillicuddy (Goaltender)
Emergency list
 Henry "Hal" Newman Reid Jr.
 E. Menzies 
 S. Keast
Manager
 R. Whiteford

New South Wales
The New South Wales team was made from the following players
 Les Turnbull (Captain) (forward)
 Jack Pike (forward)
 Arthur Cuthbertson (forward)
 Cyril Lane (Back)
 Dunbar Poole (Vice Captain) (back)
 Graham (Goaltender)
Emergency list
 Rowe
 Bray
 Knowles
 Swannel
 Allport
 Fowler

Player statistics

Scoring leaders
The following players led the interstate championship for points.

Leading goaltenders
The following goaltenders led the interstate championship for goals against average.

See also

 Goodall Cup
 Ice Hockey Australia
 Australian Ice Hockey League

References

Goodall Cup
1910 in Australian sport
1910 in ice hockey
Sports competitions in Sydney
1910s in Sydney